Poncelet's giant rat or Poncelet's naked-tailed rat (Solomys ponceleti) is a species of rodent in the family Muridae.
It is found in Papua New Guinea and Solomon Islands.

References

Solomys
Rats of Asia
Rodents of Oceania
Rodents of New Guinea
Mammals of the Solomon Islands
Rodents of Indonesia
Critically endangered fauna of Asia
Critically endangered fauna of Oceania
Mammals described in 1935
Taxonomy articles created by Polbot
Taxa named by Ellis Le Geyt Troughton